Atanas Aleksandrov (2 June 1952 – 11 April 2004) was a Bulgarian football midfielder.

References

1952 births
2004 deaths
Bulgarian footballers
PFC Slavia Sofia players
Omonia Aradippou players
Bulgaria international footballers
Association football midfielders
Bulgarian expatriate footballers
Expatriate footballers in Cyprus
Bulgarian expatriate sportspeople in Cyprus
Cypriot First Division players